The 2017 Tulsa Roughnecks FC season is the club's third season of existence, and their third in the United Soccer League. It is the club's first season playing in the second division of American soccer following U.S. Soccer's sanctioning of USL as a Division II professional league. Including the previous iterations of franchises named "Tulsa Roughnecks", this is the 17th season of a soccer club named the "Roughnecks" playing in the Tulsa metropolitan area.

Outside of the USL, the Roughnecks participated in the 2017 U.S. Open Cup.

Background

Roster

Transfers

In 

|}

Out 

|}

Competitions

Preseason

USL

Standings

Results

U.S. Open Cup

Statistics

See also 
 2017 Chicago Fire season
 2017 FC Dallas season

References 

2017 USL season
2017
2017 in sports in Oklahoma
American soccer clubs 2017 season